Trio is an unincorporated community in Williamsburg County, South Carolina, United States.

References

Unincorporated communities in Williamsburg County, South Carolina
Unincorporated communities in South Carolina